NIPC is an acronym for:
National Infrastructure Protection Center 
National Inhalant Prevention Coalition
National Insurance Professionals Corporation
Nigeria Investment Promotion Commission
Northeastern Illinois Planning Commission